The city of The Hague, Netherlands, consists of eight districts (stadsdelen, singular stadsdeel). Each district is divided into subdistricts (wijken). Each of these stadsdelen has its own district office (stadsdeelkantoor), where most of the local government activity is organised. These stadsdeelkantoren make many aspects of local government more accessible to residents. The current division of The Hague into individual stadsdelen was created in 1988 by the main city government. This division of The Hague into wijken and buurten (neighbourhoods) deviates from the 1953 divisions that had been known to many residents.

List of districts

Notes

References

 
 
Geography of The Hague